The trường ca "long song", is a lyrical genre of Vietnamese song and poetry. The term trường ca in Vietnamese applies both to poetry - including the European epos, or Epic poem (:vi:trường ca), but secondly also to a specific Vietnamese song genre (:vi:Trường ca (âm nhạc)) which is a development of both European and traditional Vietnamese models. Notable exponents of the song genre include the three masters of the 1960s and 1970s, Văn Cao, Phạm Duy and Trịnh Công Sơn who wrote long lyrics with the intention not of poems to be read, but to be sung. An example of French references is found in Trịnh Công Sơn's trường ca, using the image of a tireless sand crab, which draws on Camus' The Myth of Sisyphus to make a Vietnamese lament-ballad.

Examples
Sông Lô của Văn Cao (1947)
Ba Đình nắng của Bùi Công Kỳ (1947)
Bình ca của Nguyễn Đình Phúc (1947)
Con đường cái quan của Phạm Duy (1954)
Du kích sông Thao của Đỗ Nhuận (thập niên 1950)
Đóa hoa vô thường của Trịnh Công Sơn
Hội trùng dương của Phạm Đình Chương
Hòn vọng phu của Lê Thương (1947)
Mẹ Việt Nam của Phạm Duy (1960)
Người Hà Nội của Nguyễn Đình Thi (1947)
Hàn Mặc Tử của Phạm Duy
Minh họa Kiều của Phạm Duy
Người Việt Nam của Trương Quý Hải.

References

Vietnamese music